George Percival Alexander (1886 – 14 November 1929) was a British lacrosse player who competed in the 1908 Summer Olympics. He was part of the British team which won the silver medal.

He wasa long time misidentified as Gustav Bernhard Franck Alexander (b. 20. September 1881 in Chorlton-cum-Hardy, Greater Manchester - d. 5. December 1967 in Little Kimble, Buckinghamshire),

References

External links

1886 births
1929 deaths
Lacrosse players at the 1908 Summer Olympics
Olympic lacrosse players of Great Britain
Olympic silver medallists for Great Britain
Medalists at the 1908 Summer Olympics
20th-century British people